The 1977 World Archery Championships was the 29th edition of the event. It was held in Canberra, Australia on 8–11 February 1977 and was organised by World Archery Federation (FITA).

Medals summary

Recurve

Medals table

References

External links
 World Archery website
 Complete results

World Championship
World Archery
A
World Archery Championships
Sports competitions in Canberra
February 1977 sports events in Australia
1970s in Canberra